Eli-ad is an Israeli settlement organized as a moshav in the southern Golan Heights.

The international community considers Israeli settlements in the Golan Heights illegal under international law, but the Israeli government disputes this.

History
Israel captured the area from Syria in June 1967 in the Six-Day War. In 1968 as a Nahal settlement was founded, and became a moshav two years later. It was originally called El Al, "skyward", the same as Israel's national airline El Al (as an alteration of the name of the Arab village of Al ‘Al = "the high place"), and later renamed Eli Al, before assuming its current name. It is named in memory of the initially successful Israeli spy Eli Cohen, who was captured and hanged in Syria.

Landmarks
Eliad is home to the Château Golan winery.

The nearby stream, Nahal El Al (Hebrew) or Wadi Dafila (Arabic) is a popular hiking destination and contains the Black Waterfall, named for its black basalt rock and situated closer to Avnei Eitan, and the downstream White Waterfall, named for its white limestone rock and located next to Eliad.

See also
Israeli-occupied territories

References

Israeli settlements in the Golan Heights
Moshavim
Nahal settlements
Populated places established in 1968
Golan Regional Council
Populated places in Northern District (Israel)
1968 establishments in the Israeli Military Governorate